Bartsrashen or Bardzrashen may refer to:
Bardzrashen, Ararat, Armenia
Bardzrashen, Shirak, Armenia
Bitlidzha, Armenia